Joseph Gray (born January 20, 1984) is an American world champion runner who competes mostly in trail, mountain and snowshoe races. He won the World Mountain Running Championships in 2016. He is the first Black American to not only make the Team USA World Mountain Running Team, but also the first Black American to win the USA National Mountain Running Championships and the World Mountain Running Championships.

Gray was voted the greatest male mountain runner of all time by a poll conducted by the  World Mountain Running Association.

Biography
Gray's initial inspiration to compete was Simon Gutierrez. Gray has been a 28-time Team USA national team member. He is the only African-American to be part of the U.S. Mountain Running Team at any level. He is a 16-Time USA National Champion  and was the first ever national champion at the 30k trail distance.

In 2012 he was the co-winner of the XTERRA Trail Run World Championships.  In 2018 he became a 4-Time Xterra World Trail Running Champion after winning the Championship 3 years consecutively 2016–2018.

He is the American record holder at the Mount Washington Road Race. In August 2016, Gray won the Pikes Peak Ascent in a time of 2:05, the fastest climb since 1995. The following month, he won the World Mountain Running Championships which were held in Sapareva Banya, Bulgaria.   In April 2017, Gray won the RRCA Colorado State Championship 5K Non-Road Race, held in conjunction with the Hams and Hamstrings 5K.

On July 20, 2018, Joseph Gray ran the fastest known time (FKT) up Mount Antero from the bottom of FS road 277 to the top of Mount Antero in 1:23:10. He used a running power meter during the attempt.

He raced the cog train up Agiocoochook and was the only one who beat the train 

Gray has the FKT on the Manitou Incline in Colorado Springs with a time of 17:45 verified with GPS.

References

External links

Joseph Gray at A Runner’s Life Podcast

Living people
American male long-distance runners
American male ultramarathon runners
American male mountain runners
Trail runners
Snowshoe runners
1984 births
World Mountain Running Championships winners